Falavarjan (also Romanized as Falāvarjān, Falāvar Jān, and Felāvarjān; also known as Pol-e Vargān, Pol-e Varqān, Pul-i-Vargān, and Mollāvarjān) is a city and capital of Falavarjan County, Isfahan Province, Iran.  At the 2006 census, its population was 37,740, in 9,097 families.

The ancient name of this city was Barze which means the branch of a tree or cultivation. This name gradually changed to Varjan. During the Safavid period due to the construction of a bridge on the Zayandeh Rood (river), Varjan was renamed Polavarjan and thence to Falavarjan. The city is a part of Esfahan metropolitan area.
For its public transit system, the city is served by Falavarjan County Municipalities Mass Transit Organization bus network.

Cultural centers

Islamic Azad University of Falavarjan, founded in 1984.

References

Populated places in Falavarjan County
Cities in Isfahan Province